The 2017–18 Melbourne City FC W-League season was the club's third season in the W-League, the premier competition for women's football in Australia. The team was based at the City Football Academy at La Trobe University and played home games at both AAMI Park and CB Smith Reserve. The club was managed by former Melbourne City men's player Patrick Kisnorbo who was the assistant coach in the previous season. Jess Fishlock, who was a player-coach in the previous season, returned to the club and was Kisnorbo's assistant coach.

Players

Squad information
Melbourne City's Women squad for the 2017–18 W-League, updated 15 February 2018.

Transfers in

Transfers out

Contract extensions

Managerial staff

Squad statistics

Competitions

W-League

League table

Results summary

Results by round

Fixtures
 Click here for season fixtures.

Finals series

References

External links
 Official Website

Melbourne City FC (A-League Women) seasons
Melbourne City